Elly Is So Hot is Seo In-young's debut studio album. It was released on February 26, 2007.  The first single from the album, 너를 원해 (I Want You), debuted at #17 on the Soompi chart in March 2007.

Track listing
Intro
Hit
너를 원해 (I Want You)
가르쳐줘요 (Teach Me)
Blue Song
6th Sense
Something
UR My Style
Seaes Hotel
Just Tonight (너를 원해, Lo-Fi House Remix) (Just Tonight (I Want you, Lo-Fi House Remix))
Hit (Hi-Voltage Remix) 
가르쳐줘요 (MR) (Teach Me (MR))

References

2007 albums